Heinrich Silbermann (unknown — unknown), was a Romanian chess player, Romanian Chess Championship winner (1935).

Biography
In the mid-1930s Heinrich Silbermann was one of the strongest Romanian chess players. In 1935, in Bucharest he won Romanian Chess Championship.

Heinrich Silbermann played for Romania in the Chess Olympiad:
 In 1935, at first board in the 6th Chess Olympiad in Warsaw (+0, =2, -6).

References

External links

Heinrich Silbermann chess games at 365chess.com
Heinrich Silbermann (other link) chess games at 365chess.com

Year of birth missing
Year of death missing
Romanian chess players
Chess Olympiad competitors